National Hotel, or The National Hotel or variations, may refer to:

in Australia
National Hotel (Fremantle), in Western Australia
National Hotel, Warwick, in Queensland
Queensland National Hotel in Mount Morgan, Queensland

in Canada
National Hotel (Toronto)

in Cuba
Hotel Nacional de Cuba

in Russia
Hotel National, Moscow

in Taiwan
National Hotel (Taiwan)

in the United States
National Hotel (Nevada City, California)
National Hotel (Miami Beach, Florida)
National Hotel (St. Louis, Missouri)
National Hotel (Cuylerville, New York)
National Hotel (Washington, D.C.)